Ficus copiosa, the plentiful fig, is a species of flowering plant in the family Moraceae, native to Sulawesi, the Moluccas, Papuasia, Queensland, and on to some western Pacific islands. The leaves are widely consumed as a vegetable by local peoples.

References

copiosa
Flora of Sulawesi
Flora of the Maluku Islands
Flora of Papuasia
Flora of Queensland
Flora of the Caroline Islands
Flora of Vanuatu
Plants described in 1840